OA-4, previously known as Orbital-4, was the fourth successful flight of the Orbital ATK uncrewed resupply spacecraft Cygnus and its third flight to the International Space Station (ISS) under the Commercial Resupply Services (CRS-1) contract with NASA. With the Antares launch vehicle undergoing a redesign following its failure during the Orb-3 launch, OA-4 was launched by an Atlas V launch vehicle. Following three launch delays due to inclement weather beginning on 3 December 2015, OA-4 was launched at 21:44:57 UTC on 6 December 2015. It was released on 19 February 2016 after 72 days at the International Space Station. Deorbit occurred on 20 February 2016 at approximately 16:00 UTC.

Spacecraft 

OA-4 was the fourth of eight flights by Orbital ATK under the Commercial Resupply Services (CRS-1) contract with NASA and the inaugural flight of the larger Enhanced Cygnus PCM. The mission was originally scheduled for 1 April 2015. The Atlas V launch vehicle launched in the 401 vehicle configuration with a four-meter fairing, no solid rocket boosters and a single-engine Centaur upper stage.

In an Orbital ATK tradition, this Cygnus spacecraft was named Deke Slayton II after Deke Slayton, one of NASA's original Mercury Seven astronauts and Director of Flight Operations, who died in 1993. This spacecraft reuses the name Deke Slayton, originally applied to the Orb-3 spacecraft which was lost in an Antares rocket explosion in October 2014.

Manifest 

Total cargo: 
 Crew supplies: 
 Crew care packages
 Crew provisions
 Food

 Vehicle Hardware: 
 Crew health care system hardware
 Environment control and life-support equipment
 Electrical power system hardware
 Extravehicular robotics equipment
 Flight crew equipment
 PL facility
 Structural and mechanical equipment
 Internal thermal control system hardware

 Science Investigations: 
 A new life science facility called the Space Automated Bio Lab (SABL) that will support studies on cell cultures, bacteria, and other micro-organisms;
 A microsatellite deployer and the second microsatellite to be deployed from the space station;
 The NASA LONESTAR experimental payload consisting of the AggieSat4 and Bevo-2 satellites
 The AggieSat4 satellite, built by engineering students at Texas A&M University, deploys the smaller Bevo-2 CubeSat stored inside of it;
 The Bevo-2 CubeSat, designed and built by engineering and computer science students at the University of Texas at Austin;
 Experiments that will study the behavior of gases and liquids and clarify the thermo-physical properties of molten steel; and
 Evaluations of flame-resistant textiles.

 Computer Resources: 
 Command and data handling
 Photo and TV equipment

 Spacewalk Equipment: 
 A new SAFER jetpack
 Extravehicular Mobility Unit (EMU) parts, including legs, gloves, tethers, and batteries
 Airlock cooling loop parts

Total cargo with packing material:

See also 
 Uncrewed spaceflights to the International Space Station

References

External links 

Cygnus (spacecraft)
Spacecraft launched by Atlas rockets
Spacecraft launched in 2015
Spacecraft which reentered in 2016
Supply vehicles for the International Space Station
Deke Slayton